is the 22nd single by Japanese idol duo Wink. Written by Rui Serizawa and Satoshi Kadokura, the single was released on October 26, 1994, by Polystar Records.

Background and release 
"Cherie Mon Cherie" was used by Unicharm for its Air Wick commercial featuring Wink.

"Cherie Mon Cherie" peaked at No. 29 on the Oricon's weekly charts and sold over 25,000 copies.

Track listing 
All music is arranged by Satoshi Kadokura.

Chart positions 
Weekly charts

Year-end charts

References

External links 
 
 

1994 singles
1994 songs
Wink (duo) songs
Japanese-language songs